The Flying Fish is a powered steel roller coaster located at Thorpe Park in Surrey. The ride was known as Space Station Zero upon opening in 1984, until being moved outdoors in 1990. It was removed in 2005 to make way for Stealth, but reinstalled in a different location two years later.

History

Space Station Zero opened in 1984 at Thorpe Park in England and was the park's first roller coaster, themed as a flight through outer space. After boarding, the train travelled around a bend through a tunnel of flashing lights. The ride did two laps of the track, the first in the dark and the second lit by glitter balls to appear as stars. The attraction closed in 1989 before being moved outside and renamed The Flying Fish.  In 2005 the ride was removed in to make room for the construction of Stealth.

Flying Fish was reinstalled in 2007. It is located in the Amity area between Depth Charge and Tidal Wave. The ride opened on March 10, 2007 with a new colour scheme, on-ride camera, and new lap bar restraints.

References

External links
 Flying Fish at Total Thorpe Park
 Flying Fish at ThemeParks-UK

Steel roller coasters
Powered roller coasters
Roller coasters operated by Merlin Entertainments
Roller coasters in the United Kingdom
Roller coasters introduced in 2007
Thorpe Park roller coasters
Outer space in amusement parks